András Fricsay (born András Fricsay Kali Son 2 April 1942 in Szeged, Hungary) is a German actor and director.

Filmography
 Preis der Freiheit (1966)
 Skin to Skin (1969)
 Baal (1970)
 Eines langen Tages Reise in die Nacht (1973)
 Das Blaue Palais: Das Genie (1974)
 Das Blaue Palais: Das Medium (1974)
 The Conquest of the Citadel (1977)
 The Roaring Fifties (1983)
 The Record (1984)
  (1984)
 The Old Fox - Season 8, Episode 4: "Von Mord war nicht Die Rede" (1984)
 Derrick - Season 11, Episode 10: "Ende einer Sehnsucht" (1984)
 Derrick - Season 12, Episode 8: "Schwester Hilde" (1985)
 Tatort - Episode 171: "Das Haus Im Wald" (1985)
  (1986)
  (1987)
 The Aggression (1988)
 Die Senkrechtstarter (1989)
 Spider's Web (1989)
  (1992)
 The Light from Dead Stars (1994)
  (1995)
 Der Hurenstreik – Eine Liebe auf St. Pauli (1999)
 Sweet Little Sixteen (1999)
  (1999)
  (1999)
 Schwurgericht – Seitenwechsel (1999)
 In der Mitte eines Lebens (2002)
 Davon stirbt man nicht (2002)
 Vier Küsse und eine E-Mail (2003)
 Cowgirl (2004)
  (2014, TV film)

External links 
 
 Bild & Bühne Agency Dresden 

German male television actors
German male film actors
20th-century German male actors
21st-century German male actors
Hungarian male film actors
Hungarian emigrants to Germany
German opera directors
Hungarian opera directors
People from Szeged
1942 births
Living people
Hungarian male television actors